Craig Headland (born October 25, 1960) is an American politician. He is a member of the North Dakota House of Representatives from the 29th District, serving since 2002. He is a member of the Republican party.

Headland serves as chairman of the House Finance and Taxation committee.

References

Living people
1960 births
People from Jamestown, North Dakota
Republican Party members of the North Dakota House of Representatives
21st-century American politicians